The Yongzheng Emperor had eight consorts, including two empresses, two imperial noble consorts, three consorts and one concubine. They are classified according to their posthumous titles.

Empresses 

 Empress Xiaojingxian (28 June 1681 – 29 October 1731), of the Ula Nara clan (烏拉那拉氏), personal name Duoqimuli (多棋木理)Primary Consort of the Fourth Prince (皇四子嫡福晉) → Primary Madame of the Prince of the Third Rank (貝勒嫡夫人) → Primary Consort of Prince Yong of the First Rank (雍親王嫡福晉) → Empress (皇后) → Empress Xiaojing (孝敬皇后) → Empress Xiaojingxian (孝敬憲皇后)
 Empress Xiaoshengxian (12 January 1692 – 2 March 1777), of the Niohuru clan (鈕祜祿氏)Concubine of the Prince of the Third Rank (貝勒妾) → Concubine of Prince Yong of the First Rank (雍親王庶福晉) → Consort Xi (熹妃) → Noble Consort Xi (熹貴妃) → Empress Dowager Chongqing (崇慶皇太后) → Empress Xiaoshengxian (孝聖憲皇后)

Imperial Noble Consorts 

 Imperial Noble Consort Dunsu (d. 23 December 1725), of the Nian clan (年氏)Secondary Madame of the Prince of the Third Rank (貝勒側夫人) → Secondary Consort of Prince Yong of the First Rank (雍親王側福晉) → Noble Consort (貴妃) → Imperial Noble Consort (皇貴妃) → Imperial Noble Consort Dunsu (敦肅皇貴妃)
 Imperial Noble Consort Chunque (December 1689/January 1690 – 27 January 1785), of the Geng clan (耿氏)Concubine of the Prince of the Third Rank (貝勒妾) → Concubine of Prince Yong of the First Rank (雍親王庶福晉) → Concubine Yu (裕嬪) → Consort Yu (裕妃) → Dowager Noble Consort Yu (裕貴太妃) → Dowager Imperial Noble Consort (皇貴太妃) → Imperial Noble Consort Chunque (純愨皇貴妃)

Consorts 

 Consort Qi (1676 – 31 May 1739), of the Li clan (李氏)  Secondary Consort of the Fourth Prince (皇四子側福晉) → Secondary Madame of the Prince of the Third Rank (貝勒側夫人) → Secondary Consort of Prince Yong of the First Rank (雍親王側福晉) → Consort Qi (齊妃) → Dowager Consort Qi (齊太妃)
 Consort Qian (1714 – 17 June 1767), of the Liugiya clan (劉佳氏), personal name Xiangyu (香玉)Second Attendant (答應) → Noble Lady (貴人) → Concubine Qian (謙嬪) → Dowager Consort Qian (謙太妃)
 Consort Ning (d. 25 June 1734), of the Wu clan (武氏), personal name Lingyuan (令媛)Concubine Ning (寧嬪) → Consort Ning (寧妃)

Concubines 

 Concubine Mao (1677 – October/November 1730), of the Song clan (宋氏)Concubine of the Prince of the Third Rank (貝勒妾) → Concubine of Prince Yong of the First Rank (雍親王庶福晉) → Concubine Mao (懋嬪)

Notes

References 

Consorts of the Yongzheng Emperor